Expectation or Expectations may refer to:

Science
 Expectation (epistemic)
 Expected value, in mathematical probability theory
 Expectation value (quantum mechanics)
 Expectation–maximization algorithm, in statistics

Music
 Expectation (album), a 2013 album by Girl's Day
 Expectation, a 2006 album by Matt Harding
 Expectations (Keith Jarrett album), 1971
 Expectations (Dance Exponents album), 1985
 Expectations (Hayley Kiyoko album), 2018
"Expectations/Overture", a song from the album
 Expectations (Bebe Rexha album), 2018
 Expectations (Katie Pruitt album), 2020
"Expectations", a song from the album
 "Expectation" (waltz), a 1980 waltz composed by Ilya Herold Lavrentievich Kittler
 "Expectation" (song), a 2010 song by Tame Impala
 "Expectations" (song), a 2018 song by Lauren Jauregui
 "Expectations", a song by Three Days Grace from Transit of Venus, 2012

See also
Great Expectations, a novel by Charles Dickens
Xpectation, 2003 studio album by Prince